Civil rights leaders are influential figures in the promotion and implementation of political freedom and the expansion of personal civil liberties and rights. They work to protect individuals and groups from political repression and discrimination by governments and private organizations, and seek to ensure the ability of all members of society to participate in the civil and political life of the state.

List
People who motivated themselves and then led others to gain and protect these rights and liberties include:

See also

 Abolition of slavery timeline
 Civil rights movement (1896–1954)
 Civil Rights Movement
 Chicano Movement
 Civil and political rights
 Civil liberties in the United Kingdom
 Convention on the Elimination of All Forms of Discrimination Against Women
 Convention on the Political Rights of Women
 Counterculture of the 1960s
 Declaration of the Rights of Man and of the Citizen
 Declaration of the Rights of Woman and of the Female Citizen
 Declaration on the Elimination of Discrimination Against Women
 English Bill of Rights
 Equality before the law
 European Convention on Human Rights
 Founding Fathers of the United States
 African American founding fathers of the United States
 Free Speech fight
 Free Speech Movement
 History of human rights
 Human rights
 Human rights awards
 International Covenant on Civil and Political Rights
 LGBT rights by country
 LGBT social movements
 List of cannabis rights leaders
 List of human rights organizations
 List of indigenous rights organizations
 List of LGBT rights activists
 List of LGBT rights organizations
 List of Nobel Peace Prize laureates
 List of peace activists
 List of suffragists and suffragettes
 List of women's rights activists
 Magna Carta
 National human rights institutions
 Seneca Falls Convention
 Status of same-sex marriage
 Suffrage
 Timeline of the civil rights movement
 Timeline of first women's suffrage in majority-Muslim countries
 Timeline of women's rights (other than voting)
 Timeline of women's suffrage
 United Nations High Commissioner for Human Rights
 United Nations Human Rights Committee
 United Nations Human Rights Council
 United States Bill of Rights
 Universal Declaration of Human Rights
 Universal suffrage
 Virginia Declaration of Rights
 Women's rights
 Women's Suffrage

References

See each individual for their references.

External links
BlackHistoryDaily.com – Activists

Lists of social activists